The 2014 Men's Junior AHF Cup was the fourth edition of the Men's Junior AHF Cup, the qualification tournament for the Men's Hockey Junior Asia Cup organized by the Asian Hockey Federation.

It was held at the Maulana Bhasani Hockey Stadium in Dhaka, Bangladesh from 30 November to 7 December 2014.
Bangladesh won the tournament for the first time and qualified together with Oman for the 2015 Junior Asia Cup.

Teams
The following five teams participated in the tournament.

Results

Group stage

Classification round

Third and fourth place

Final

Statistics

Final standings

Goalscorers

References

Men's Junior AHF Cup
Junior AHF Cup
Junior AHF Cup
International field hockey competitions hosted by Bangladesh
Sport in Dhaka
Junior AHF Cup
Junior AHF Cup
2010s in Dhaka
AHF Cup